Hedingham may refer to:

Places
Castle Hedingham, a village in Essex, United Kingdom
Hedingham, a neighborhood in Raleigh, North Carolina
Sible Hedingham, a village in Essex, United Kingdom

Ships
 , a Royal Navy ship launched on 26 January 1944, and renamed HMCS Orangeville before launch.
 , a Royal Navy ship launched on 30 October 1944 and broken up in 1958.

Other
Hedingham Castle, a Norman keep in the British village of Castle Hedingham
Hedingham & Chambers, a bus operating company in the East of England
Hedingham School, an academy secondary school in Sible Hedingham, Essex
Hedingham, a street in Moira, County Down, United Kingdom